Michinmahuida (alternate spellings Minchinmávida or Michimahuida) is a glaciated stratovolcano located in Los Lagos Region of Chile. It lies about 15 km east of Chaitén volcano, and was extensively covered in ash during the 2008 eruption of Chaitén. The stratovolcano lies above the regional Liquine-Ofqui Fault zone, and the ice-covered massif towers over the south portion of Pumalín Park. It has a summit elevation of 2,450 meters above sea level.

See also 
 List of volcanoes in Chile
 Chaitén
 Chaitén (volcano)
 List of Ultras of South America

References

Sources
 
 "Volcán Minchinmavida, Chile" on Peakbagger
 "South American Summits Ranked by Re-ascent"

Mountains of Chile
Stratovolcanoes of Chile
Volcanoes of Los Lagos Region
Holocene stratovolcanoes